Portrait of Genius is a 1964 LP album by Hindustani classical musician Ravi Shankar. It was digitally remastered and released in CD format by Angel Records in 1998. Matthew Greenwald of Allmusic described the album as "essential for any fan of Shankar or Indian music".

Track listing

Side 1

Side 2

References

1964 albums
Ravi Shankar albums
World Pacific Records albums
Angel Records albums